Garry Clark (born 4 January 1965) is an English former professional rugby league footballer who played in the 1980s and 1990s.

Playing career

Club career
Clark made his début for Hull Kingston Rovers in 1982. In his time at Rovers he was a First Division Championship winner twice (in the 1983–84 season and 1984–85 season), a Premiership winner, a John Player Trophy winner, a Yorkshire Cup winner and a Second Division Championship winner.

Clark played in the Robins' famous 8–6 victory over Queensland as they toured Papua New Guinea and England in October 1983. He played in Hull Kingston Rovers' 18–10 victory over Castleford Tigers in the Final of the 1983-84 Rugby League Premiership during the 1983–84 season.

Clark played in Hull Kingston Rovers' 12–29 defeat by Hull F.C. in the 1984–85 Yorkshire Cup Final during the 1984–85 season at Boothferry Park, Kingston upon Hull, on Saturday 27 October 1984. He also played and scored a try in Hull Kingston Rovers' 12–0 victory over Hull F.C. in the 1984–85 John Player Special Trophy Final during the 1984–85 season at Boothferry Park, Kingston upon Hull on Saturday 26 January 1985, and played in Hull Kingston Rovers' 36–16 defeat against St Helens in the Final of the 1984-85 Rugby League Premiership during the 1984-85 season.

Clark played and scored a try in the 22–18 victory over Castleford in the 1985–86 Yorkshire Cup Final during the 1985–86 season at Headingley, Leeds, on Sunday 27 October 1985, and played in the 8–11 defeat by Wigan in the 1985–86 John Player Special Trophy Final during the 1985–86 season at Elland Road, Leeds on Saturday 11 January 1986. Clark played in Hull Kingston Rovers' 14–15 defeat by Castleford in the 1985–86 Challenge Cup Final during the 1985–86 season at Wembley Stadium, London, on Saturday 3 May 1986.

His final honours with the club was as part of the Second Division Championship winning team of the 1989–90 season.

His form dipped following a number of shoulder injuries in the late 80's and early 90's and he joined Scarborough Pirates at the start of the 1991–92 season, scoring 11 tries in 25 appearances. After the club folded at the end of the season, he joined Hull F.C. Clark played three games for Hull before announcing his retirement in January 1993 at the age of 28 due to a shoulder injury.

International honours
Clark won a cap for England while at Hull Kingston Rovers in 1984 against Wales scoring a hat-trick, and won caps for Great Britain while at Hull Kingston Rovers in 1984 against France (2 matches), and in 1985 against France. He toured Australia and New Zealand in 1984.

References

External links
 (archived by web.archive.org) Profile at hullfc.com

1965 births
Living people
English rugby league players
Rugby league players from Kingston upon Hull
Rugby league wingers
Hull Kingston Rovers players
Scarborough Pirates players
Hull F.C. players
England national rugby league team players
Great Britain national rugby league team players